Tennis on TNT is a television program produced by the basic cable television network TNT that broadcasts the main professional tennis tournaments in the United States. From 2000-2002, TNT alongside CNN Sports Illustrated (and CNNfn in 2002 due to the former shutting down operations earlier in the year) broadcast same day, weekday coverage (approximately 89 hours of programming with TNT covering about 61 hours in prime time) of Wimbledon, replacing sister network HBO.

TNT was ultimately replaced by ESPN2 while NBC still handled the American broadcast television portion of Wimbledon coverage. ESPN would eventually gain exclusive rights to Wimbledon, starting with the 2012 tournament.

Commentators

Marv Albert (men's play-by-play)
Mary Carillo (analyst/reporter/women's play-by-play)
Jim Courier (men's analyst)
Zina Garrison (women's analyst)
Jim Huber (essayist)
Ernie Johnson, Jr. (studio host)
Phil Jones (reporter)
Barry MacKay (women's play-by-play)
Martina Navratilova (women's analyst)

References

External links
Wimbledon 2001 - TNT.tv
Wimbledon 2002 - TNT.tv
NBC Sports And Turner Sports Acquire Rights To Wimbledon Championships

TNT (American TV network) original programming
TNT
Turner Sports
CNN/SI original programming
2000 American television series debuts
2002 American television series endings
2000s American television news shows